Ewington is an unincorporated community in Gallia County, in the U.S. state of Ohio.

History
Ewington was platted in 1852 by George Ewing, and named for his father William "Swago Bill" Ewing. A post office called Ewington was established in 1850, and remained in operation until 1984.

References

Unincorporated communities in Gallia County, Ohio
Unincorporated communities in Ohio